Blueprints of Jazz Vol. 2 is an album by saxophonist Billy Harper recorded in 2006 and released in 2008 on the Talking House Records label. It is part of the Blueprints of Jazz series conceived, produced and recorded by Talking House Productions with an aim to expose the histories and current work of important but often lesser-known jazz players who had contributed to the sounds of jazz legends from the 50’s, 60’s, and 70’s. Production and recording of the albums was helmed by Talking House producers Marc Weibel and Stephen Smith

Reception 

In his review for AllMusic, Michael G. Nastos states "Certainly a celebration for fans of the 65-year-old Harper and a welcome addition to his potent discography, this CD represents him playing at an exceptionally high level, staying true to his spirit, and still making powerful music". In JazzTimes Michael J. West wrote "The album is a tableau of Harper's spiritual jazz, bookended with Amiri Baraka poems on the music's evolution in both America and Africa. When it's on point, Blueprints is brilliant; when it's off, it just misses the mark".

Track listing 
All compositions by Billy Harper except where noted.
 "Africa Revisited" (Amiri Baraka, Billy Harper) – 16:45
 "Knowledge of Self" (Baraka, Harper) – 9:06
 "Another Kind of Thoroughbred" – 4:33
 "Thoughts and Slow Actions" – 5:37
 "Time and Time Again" – 5:14 		
 "Who Here Can Just Our Fates?" – 7:46
 "Amazing Grace" (Traditional) – 4:03
 "Cast the First Stone? (...If You Yourself Have No Sins)" – 12:26
 "Oh... If Only" (Baraka, Harper) – 6:14

Personnel 
Billy Harper – tenor saxophone, vocals
Amiri Baraka – spoken word (tracks 1, 2 & 9)
Keyon Harold – trumpet, French horn
Charles McNeal – alto saxophone (tracks 5 & 8) 
Francesca Tanksley – piano
Clarence Seay (tracks 1-6 & 8), Louie Spears (tracks: 1-3 & 5-9) – bass
Aaron Scott – drums

References 

2008 albums
Billy Harper albums